HMS Whitshed (D77/I77) was an Admiralty modified W-class destroyer of the Royal Navy. She was ordered from Swan Hunter & Wigham Richardson Ltd under the 14th Order for Destroyers in the Emergency War Program of 1918–19. She was the first ship to carry the name.

Construction
HMS Whitsheds keel was laid on 3 June 1918 at the Swan Hunter & Wigham Richardson Ltd. at Wallsend on Tyne. She was launched on 31 January 1919. She had a displacement of 1,140 tons standard and up to 1,550 full load.

She was propelled by three Yarrow water tube boilers powering Brown-Curtis geared steam turbines developing 27,000 SHP driving two screws for a maximum designed speed of 34 knots. She was oil-fired and had a bunkerage of 320 to 370 tons. This gave a range of between 3500 nautical miles at 15 knots and 900 nautical miles at 32 knots.

She shipped four BL 4.7 in (120-mm) Mk.I guns, mount P Mk.I naval guns in four single centre-line turrets. The turrets were disposed as two forward and two aft in super imposed firing positions. She also carried two QF 2 pdr Mk.II "pom-pom" (40 mm L/39) mounted abeam between funnels. Abaft of the second funnel, she carried six 21-inch Torpedo Tubes in triple mounts on the centre-line.

Inter-War period

HMS Whitshed was commissioned on 11 July 1919 into the Royal Navy with pennant number FA7.  She was assigned to the 3rd Destroyer Flotilla in the Atlantic Fleet.  In October 1919 she was assigned the pennant number D77 under a simplification of the pennant number system. The Flotilla served in Home waters in the early 1920s. The Flotilla was first assigned to the Mediterranean and in 1926 to the China Station. She was involved in the Nanking Incident in March 1927. When the United States Navy gunboat  was heavily damaged by fire while at sea off China on 14 March 1934, Whitshed, her sister ship , and the merchant ship SS Tsinan came to Fultons assistance. Wishart and Tsinan took off Fultons crew, three of whom had suffered minor injuries, and took them to the Royal Navy Dockyard at Hong Kong while Whitshed stood by Fulton until a salvage party could put the fire out. The United States Department of the Navy later passed thanks to British naval authorities for the assistance Wishart and Whitshed provided to Fulton and her crew.

Later in the 1930s, Whitshed was placed in reserve as more modern destroyers came on line.

World War Two
In 1939, HMS Whitshed was reactivated and assigned to the 18th Destroyer Flotilla at Portland for convoy defence in the English Channel and South-West Approaches.  On 30 January 1940, in conjunction with the sloop  and an RAF Sunderland flying boat from No. 228 Squadron, Whitshed sank  in the South-West Approaches whilst escorting convoy OA30G.

In April, she was transferred to the 19th Destroyer Flotilla at Dover to assist with support of operations off the Belgian and Dutch coasts. She took part in the demolition and evacuation of IJmuiden and Amsterdam (Operation XD(A)) in early May 1940. She then carried supplies to Dunkirk and embarked the Irish Guards before assisting in the evacuation of the Hook of Holland (Operation Ordnance) and Ostend in mid-May.

On 22 May, Whitshed escorted ships carrying troops of the 20th Guards Brigade to Boulogne in order to hold the town while evacuation operations took place, with Whitshed carrying anti-tank guns. On her return journey she carried RAF personnel, Prisoners of War and civilians back to England.  She returned to Boulogne on 23 May as evacuation operations continued, picking up wounded troops and shelling German forces before being damaged by German bombers, with one killed and 13 wounded. Later that evening, when some air cover was available, Whitshed along with sister ship , reentered Boulogne, with each ship embarking over 550 men.  On the 26th she deployed for the evacuation of Allied troops from Dunkirk (Operation Dynamo). At this time her pennant number was changed to I77 for visual signalling purposes. Upon release from Op Dynamo she returned to Harwich and convoy defence, and anti-invasion patrols in the North Sea and English Channel. She was one of the few ships not damaged at Dunkirk.

On 31 July she sustained serious structural damage after detonating a mine off Harwich.   towed her back to Harwich. She was under repair until December.

The year 1941 was one of continuing convoy escort and patrolling of the North Sea and English Channel. In February she escorted Motor Torpedo Boats for mine laying in the North Sea. The operation came under air attack with no casualties or damage.

For the remainder of 1942 and most of 1943, Whitshed undertook convoy escort duties and patrolled the North Sea and English Channel. In 1942, her ‘A’ gun was replaced with a twin 6-pounder army gun for engaging E-Boats. In November 1943 she was in action with E-Boats while escorting convoy CW221 off Hastings with two motor gun boats and four motor launches of the Coastal Forces. On 18 April 1944 she was in action again with E-Boats on a mine laying operation in the English Channel.

Then she returned to Southend to escort the build-up convoys.

In July she was released from Operation Neptune and resumed mercantile convoy escort and interception patrols engaging E-Boats and submersibles employed in mine laying operations in the North Sea and English Channel through April 1945. After VE-Day she was deployed in re-occupation operations. In June 1945 she was reduced to reserve status.

Disposition
HMS Whitshed was not deployed again operationally and after the end of hostilities she was paid off and reduced to reserve status. The ship was placed on the Disposal List in 1946. She was sold to BISCO in February 1947 for demolition by TJ King. The ship arrived at the breakers yard at Gateshead in April 1948.

Notes

Bibliography

External links
 

 

V and W-class destroyers of the Royal Navy
World War II destroyers of the United Kingdom
1919 ships
Ships built on the River Tyne